David L. Branscum is a former state legislator in Arkansas who now works for the USDA. He served in the Arkansas House of Representatives until 2017. He is a Republican. Since 2017 he has been state director of the USDA's rural development program. He is married and has five sons.

He is a native of Marshall, Arkansas and a graduate of the University of Arkansas.

He was succeeded in the Arkansas House by Donald Ragland.

References

Year of birth missing (living people)
Living people
Members of the Arkansas House of Representatives